Soul Searching is the debut mixtape by American singer-songwriter Bazzi, released through Bazzi's imprint, iamcosmic, and Atlantic on August 9, 2019. It was preceded by the singles "Paradise", "Focus" and "I.F.L.Y."

Background
Bazzi called the mixtape a "journey of love, pain and growth" and said his intention was to "make a record that felt like summer and make people want to put their windows down and just enjoy it". Prior to its release, Bazzi said he wanted to release more music to his fans and "continue to build a connection with people". According to Bazzi in an interview with Billboard, the mixtape is his most personal work to date.

Track listing
Credits adapted from Spotify.

Charts

Certifications

References

2019 mixtape albums
Bazzi (singer) albums